Gary Crosby (born 8 May 1964) is an English footballer who played as a midfielder.

He is the current assistant manager of Mansfield Town.

Playing career

Crosby played for Lincoln United in his teens. He had been one of the most promising players in the Lincoln area and regularly appeared for Lincoln City's youth and reserve sides. A slight but skilful player, it was often felt his physique would prevent him turning professional. He was finally given an opportunity in the professional ranks when he joined Lincoln City on non-contract terms in September 1987. However, in a struggling team he found it difficult to make an impact and made just seven appearances for the Imps before rejoining Lincoln United.

In 1988, Crosby came to the attention of Grantham Town manager Martin O'Neill while playing for the Lincolnshire County FA side and was soon signed by Grantham on a free transfer. He made just nine appearances for the Gingerbreads scoring twice.

He joined Nottingham Forest for £20,000 (a Grantham club record) in December 1987 where he went on to make 152 appearances, scoring 12 goals, during a seven-year career at the City Ground. During his time at Forest the club played in numerous cup finals at Wembley. His most famous goal came against Manchester City in a 1–0 win for Forest in March 1990. Crosby headed the ball out of goalkeeper Andy Dibble's hand before rolling the ball into an empty net. Crosby spent three games on loan at Grimsby Town, during the 1993–94 season.

He joined Huddersfield Town on a free transfer in 1994. Crosby made just 44 appearances for the club, scoring six goals. His spell at the Yorkshire club included an appearance at Wembley in the playoff final.

The 1997–98 season saw him play a handful of times for Rushden & Diamonds. He returned to Lincoln United for the start of the 1998–99 season.

Coaching career
His return to Ashby Avenue was to be short lived and in October 1998 he linked up with close friend Nigel Clough, joining Burton Albion as player/assistant manager. Their first game in charge came at Grantham in an FA Trophy replay at The Meres, in which Albion won 3–0. Crosby made his debut for the Brewers in the 1–1 draw with Nuneaton Borough on 3 November 1998. The 2001/02 season saw Burton win the Unibond Premier Division title and promotion into the Conference under the Clough/Crosby management. Crosby resigned from his position as assistant manager in January 2005, due to work commitments. However, following a short time out of the game Crosby returned to Burton Albion ahead of the 2006/07 season. By Christmas of the 2008/09 season Clough and Crosby had led Burton Albion to a 13-point lead at the top of the Conference National; however, in January 2009 Clough left Burton Albion to replace Paul Jewell as manager of Derby County.

In January 2009 Crosby followed Nigel Clough to Derby County taking the position of assistant manager.
After the departure of Nigel Clough from Derby County in 2013 Crosby followed Clough to Sheffield United acting as coaching staff.

He later returned to Burton Albion (2015-2020) alongside manager Clough before their appointment by Mansfield Town in November 2020.

Honours
Nottingham Forest
Football League Cup winners: 1990
Full Members Cup winners: 1992

References

External links
Article adapted from original profile on Official Grantham Town website

Lincoln City F.C. Official Archive Profile
Grantham Town F.C. Official Profile
Rushden & Diamonds F.C. Official profile
The Dibble Incident video on Youtube

1964 births
People from Sleaford, Lincolnshire
Living people
English footballers
Lincoln United F.C. players
Lincoln City F.C. players
Grantham Town F.C. players
Nottingham Forest F.C. players
Grimsby Town F.C. players
Huddersfield Town A.F.C. players
Rushden & Diamonds F.C. players
Burton Albion F.C. players
Burton Albion F.C. non-playing staff
Derby County F.C. non-playing staff
Sheffield United F.C. non-playing staff
Mansfield Town F.C. non-playing staff
Premier League players
Association football midfielders
FA Cup Final players
Association football coaches